Bappeda Lhokseumawe is the Indonesian abbreviation of Badan Perencanaan Pembangunan Daerah Kota Lhokseumawe. It is a Regional Development Planning Board, namely regional technical institutions in the field of regional development research and planning led by the Head of the Agency under and responsible to the Mayor of Lhokseumawe City.

Bappeda Lhokseumawe has the duty to carry out government affairs and development in the field of Economic and Employment; infrastructure development planning; development planning of Aceh and human resources features; research and development; program and development funding; technical implementation unit, and fostering Functional Position Groups in accordance with Legislation.

History 
Bappeda Lhokseumawe formed after Lhokseumawe City became the official local government.

Function 
Duties and functions of Bappeda Kota Lhokseumawe:
 a. Technical policy formulation;
 b. Technical development;
 c. Implementation guidelines;
 d. Formulation and assessment of policy concepts;
 d.1 Prepare archetypal regional development consisting of Work Plan (RKPD) and Long-Term Regional Development Plan (RPJPD);
 e. Tasks related to development, documentation and result dissemination;
 f. Long, medium and short term local development plans;
 g. Five year Regional Development Program;
 h. Annual development program for deconcentration program and community aspirations dosentralisasi that mejaring (stakeholder);
 i. Coordinate across agencies, regional institutions and other entities;
 j. Develop planning budget with DPKAD administrative coordination by SEKDA;
 k. Research, assessment and development of regional development planning system;
 l. Coordinate implementation of local development planning and evaluation;
 m. Coordinate and synchronize City development in accordance with regional development plans;
 n. Assess success of implementation activities and progress;
 o. Planning activities in accord with the policy framework of regional development;
 p. Development activities, and development and administrative personnel; and
 q. Other official duties in accord with the basic tasks and functions

Organization Structure 
The work units of Bappeda Kota Lhokseumawe consist of:

 Head
 Secretariat
 Field of Economic Development Planning and Employment
 Field of Infrastructure Development Planning
 Development Planning of Aceh and Human Resources Privileges
 Field of Research and Development
 Program and Development Funding
 UPTB
 Functional Position Group.

References 

Lhokseumawe